Versailles cafeteria, restaurant, and bakery is a landmark eating establishment located on Calle Ocho (8th St) in Little Havana, Miami. The large restaurant seats 370 people and has ornate etched glass and statuettes and features a bakery, a takeout area, a counter window and the ability to host banquets and parties. Founded by Felipe A. Valls Sr. (from Santiago de Cuba) in 1971, Versailles is a popular restaurant among local Cuban exiles and tourists for its Cuban cuisine and connection to anti-Castro politics.

Gastronomical significance
Versailles is a popular place for Cuban food and social gathering in Miami, serving "cafecito", "cortadito", Cuban pastries (beef or guava), and "croquetas" at a walk-up window.

In its main dining room, the restaurant also serves dishes including Moros, palomilla steaks (Cuban minute steak), maduros, tasajo, croquetas de yuca, tamal en cazuela, and milanesa.  There is an adjacent bakery, a take-out counter, and ample meeting space.

In 2001, the restaurant won a James Beard Foundation Award as an American Classic.

Political significance

For decades, Versailles has been ground zero for the Cuban-American exile community in South Florida. The restaurant has been a gathering point for anti-Castro protesters and the press wanting to cover their opinions.

During Fidel Castro's hospitalization in August 2006, the news media set up a small tent city outside the restaurant in case news would break from the location.  Cuban-American politicians, including those from out-of-state like New Jersey Senator Robert Menendez, often hold fundraisers and rallies at the restaurant.

Revelers celebrated for hours in front of Versailles when Fidel Castro's death was announced soon after midnight in the early morning hours of November 26, 2016.

References

External links 

 Official website
 BBC: "Billing itself as 'Miami's most popular Cuban restaurant since 1971', ..."
 Miami Herald: "... Versailles, the unofficial town square of el exilio ..."
 Miami Herald: Little Havana's Versailles is more than a restaurant.

Cuban-American cuisine
Cuban-American culture in Miami
Restaurants in Miami
Cuban restaurants
Restaurants established in 1971
James Beard Foundation Award winners